Andrey Vyacheslavovich Lysikov (born 29 September 1971 in Moscow) is a Russian musical artist, singer, songwriter, poet and rapper, known by his stage name Dolphin (or Дельфин). He won the award of best artist at the 2004 MTV Russian Music Awards. He also played at the Live 8 Russia concert.

Biography

Dolphin's musical career started in 1992 when he joined the infamous Russian boy's band of the 90's – "Malchyshnik" ("Stag Do"). It was at that moment that he realized it was time to stop selling "matreshkas" and breakdancing at Arbat street and actually try to achieve something in the music business. Quickly, he became the obvious leader and author of practically all lyrics.

Dolphin's appearance in "Malchyshnik" immediately changed the band's image and turned the boy's band creation into a brand new project, whose main idea was to shock the public. Everything about "Malchyshnik" – their lyrics, behavior at concerts, the image of the guys – all was about epatage. The band's biggest hit single was Dolphin's song "Sex Non Stop" (the very name of the song was absolutely unacceptable to the post-Soviet pop music of that time).

In 1993, still being in "Malchyshnik", Dolphin started recording his solo tracks, feeling a need for creating something different. Since 1996, when "Malchyshnik" split up, Dolphin continued to produce album after album, striking his fans and music critics with shrill and frank lyrics and powerful sound. During his musical career Dolphin released 13 albums.

He became a cult person and an idol of a whole generation, but at the same time he stands aside from Russia's rock and pop so-called "elite". He was never estimated as any musical type with the generally used term. Though, conditionally, he describes his style as: poetry reading, with an edge – to an electronic/rock beat.

A unique and remarkable poet, Dolphin is respected by professional writers, and the National Russian Writers' Union acknowledges him as one of the most outstanding modern poets. The sincerity of his creativity never leaves anyone indifferent. In the year 2000 Dolphin was awarded one of the most prestigious Russian awards – "Triumph" – for his contribution to the national music culture.

In 2002 he signed his contract with Universal Music Russia. His album "Zvezda" ("The Star") has been released 21 March 2004.One of the album's tracks, "Glaza" ("Eyes") was written and produced by Dolphin together with Stella Katsoudos, a well known after her collaborations with Peter Gabriel, Trent Reznor, and Ministry.

The singles from the album, "Vesna" ("Spring") and "Romance" ("Love song") were at the top of Russian radio charts for over 20 weeks and brought Dolphin to a new stage of popularity throughout the country.

His latest album, "Kraj" ("Edge") was released in 2019.

Мальчишник/Malchishnik
Мальчишник (or Malchishnik) was hip-hop/dance/pop from 1995 till 1997.

Releases with Dolphin
Поговорим о Сексе, (Pogovorim o Sekse/Let's Talk about Sex), (1991)
Мисс Большая Грудь, (Miss Bolshaya Grud/Miss Big Breast), (1992)
Кегли, (Kegli/Skittles), (1995)

Дубовый Гаайъ
Releases
Концерт в Риге (live), (Kontsert v Rige/Live in Riga), (1991)
Stop Killing Dolphins, (1992)
Синяя лирика №2, (Sinyaya Lirika №2/Blue Lyric №2), (1993)

Мишины Дельфины/Mishiny Delfiny
Mishiny Delfiny (or Мишины Дельфины) was side-project of Andrey Lysikov (Dolphin) and Mikhail Voinov ("Дубовый Гаайъ" member) from 1995 till 1997. Just one album was released.

Albums
Игрушки, (Igrushki/Toys), (1997)

Дельфин/Dolphin

Personal life
Dolphin is married to photographer Lika Gulliver. They have 2 children: daughter Eve (1998) and son Myron (2008).

Awards and nominations
{| class=wikitable
|-
! Year !! Awards !! Work !! Category !! Result
|-
| 2004
| MTV Europe Music Awards
| Himself
| Best Russian Act
|

Collaborators/Members of live band

Current members/collaborators 
 Vasiliy Yakovlev — drums (2015—present)
 Igor Babko — guitar (2016—present)
 Alexander Mayorov — sound engineer (2014—present)

Former members/collaborators 
 Viktor Shevtsov — sound engineer, guitar, programming (1997—2004)
 Ivan Chernikov — bass, guitar, drum machine, sound engineer (1997—2001)
 Pavel Peretolchin — guitar, synthesizer (1998)
 Anton Korolev — sound engineer (2002—2004)
 Pavel Dodonov — guitar, bass, programming (2002—2016)
 Alexander Petrunin (aka Mewark) — guitar (2003—2004)
 Alexey Nazarchuk — drums (2004—2005)
 Renat Ibragimov — sound engineer, keyboards, bass, drum machine (2007—2014)
 Konstantin Poznekov — sound engineer, sound designer (2014)
 Sergey Govorun — drums (2014—2015)
 Dmitriy Emelianov — guitar (2016)

Discography

Studio Albums
Не в фокусе, (Ne v fokuse/Out of focus), (1997)
Глубина резкости, (Glubina rezkosti/Depth of field), (1998)
Плавники, (Plavniki/Flippers), (2000, recorded in 1998)
Ткани, (Tkani/Tissues), (2001)
Звезда, (Zvezda/Star), (2004) – SIM Records
Юность, (Yunost/Youth), (2007)
Существо, (Sushchestvo/Creature), (2011)
Андрей, (Andrey/Andrey), (2014)
Она, (Ona/Her), (2016)
442, (2018)
Край, (Kray/Edge), (2019)

Other
Серый Альбом (unreleased), (Seryi Albom/Grey Album), (1998)
Я буду жить (live), (Ya budu zhit/I shall live), (2000)
Любимые песни фанатов Дельфина (Compilation), (Favourite songs of the Dolphin's fans), (2002)
Глаза (single), (Glaza/Eyes), (2003) – Universal
Запись концерта 19.11.04 (live), (Record of the concert 11.19.04), (2004) – SIM Records
Туннель (unreleased yet), (Tunnel), (2010–?)

Soundtrack
Даже не думай ("Dazhe ne dumay"), (2002)
Даже не думай 2: Тень независимости("Dazhe ne dumay 2: Ten' Nezavisimosti"), (2004)
Grand Theft Auto IV Song "Рэп" (Rap), (2008)

References

Official website
Discography, lyrics and English translations

1971 births
Rappers from Moscow
Living people
Russian hip hop
Russian hip hop musicians